Hoyt McWhorter Dobbs (November 16, 1878, in Antioch, Alabama – December 9, 1954, in Shreveport, Louisiana) was an American bishop of the Methodist Episcopal Church, South and The Methodist Church, elected in 1922.

Prior to his election to the episcopacy, he served as a professor of Christian doctrine and as the dean (1916–20) of the Perkins School of Theology at Southern Methodist University, University Park, Dallas County, Texas.

In 1935, he became one of the founding members of Theta Phi, the professional honor society for clergy.

References
 Thomas, Mary Martha Hosford, Southern Methodist University: Founding and Early Years. 1974.
 "Friends of God", TIME, Jan. 28, 1935; accessed 12/5/06

See also
List of bishops of the United Methodist Church

American Methodist Episcopal, South bishops
Bishops of the Methodist Episcopal Church, South
1878 births
1954 deaths
Presidents of United Methodist seminaries
20th-century Methodist bishops